Eric Olen (born October 15, 1980) is an American college basketball coach who is the current head coach of the UC San Diego Tritons.

Playing career
Olen played at Spring Hill College, where he was part of three-straight Badgers' NAIA national tournament appearances, including an Elite Eight appearance in 2000.

Coaching career
Olen would join his former college coach Bill Carr as an assistant at UC San Diego in 2004, and would stay in the role until 2013 before being promoted to head coach after then head coach Chris Carlson left for an administrative role with the West Coast Conference. Olen has since led the Tritons to three CCAA regular season titles and four consecutive conference tournament titles in addition to four NCAA Division II tournament appearances. He will guide the Tritons into Division I as members of the Big West Conference starting in 2020.

Head coaching record

References

1980 births
Living people
Sportspeople from Mobile, Alabama
American men's basketball coaches
College men's basketball head coaches in the United States
Spring Hill Badgers men's basketball players
UC San Diego Tritons men's basketball coaches